In Greek mythology, the name Borus (Ancient Greek: Βῶρος) may refer to:

Borus, son of Perieres, who married Polydora, daughter of Peleus and Antigone.
Borus, a descendant of Nestor. More precisely, he was either a son of Penthilus and grandson of Periclymenus, or son of Periclymenus and father of Penthilus by Lysidice. Through Andropompus, his son or grandson, he was the grandfather or great-grandfather of Melanthus who was one of those who expelled Tisamenus from Lacedaemon and Argos.
Borus of Maeonia, father of Phaestus; his son was killed by Idomeneus in the Trojan War.

Notes

References 

 Apollodorus, The Library with an English Translation by Sir James George Frazer, F.B.A., F.R.S. in 2 Volumes, Cambridge, MA, Harvard University Press; London, William Heinemann Ltd. 1921. ISBN 0-674-99135-4. Online version at the Perseus Digital Library. Greek text available from the same website.
Homer, The Iliad with an English Translation by A.T. Murray, Ph.D. in two volumes. Cambridge, MA., Harvard University Press; London, William Heinemann, Ltd. 1924. . Online version at the Perseus Digital Library.
Homer, Homeri Opera in five volumes. Oxford, Oxford University Press. 1920. . Greek text available at the Perseus Digital Library.
 Pausanias, Description of Greece with an English Translation by W.H.S. Jones, Litt.D., and H.A. Ormerod, M.A., in 4 Volumes. Cambridge, MA, Harvard University Press; London, William Heinemann Ltd. 1918. . Online version at the Perseus Digital Library
Pausanias, Graeciae Descriptio. 3 vols. Leipzig, Teubner. 1903.  Greek text available at the Perseus Digital Library.

Characters in Greek mythology
Messenian mythology